Eryk Tyrek Williamson (born June 11, 1997) is an American professional soccer player who plays as a midfielder for Major League Soccer club Portland Timbers.

College 
Williamson attended the University of Maryland, where he played in the 2015–2017 seasons, appearing in 58 matches and scoring 14 goals. In 2017, he was awarded the Big Ten Midfielder of the Year and was a member of the All-Big Ten First Team.

Club career
Williamson was a member of the D.C. United Academy, and therefore not eligible for the MLS SuperDraft, before being traded to the Portland Timbers in January 2018. Williamson was linked with a move to Schalke in early 2018, but Schalke never made an offer. He made his professional debut as a member of Portland Timbers 2 on April 4, 2018 against Tulsa, and scored his first goal on May 12 of that year against Tacoma.

He made his debut for the Timbers senior team as a substitute on June 2, 2018 against the Los Angeles Galaxy, earned his first start on June 26, 2019 against Montreal, and scored his first goal on September 20, 2020 against Seattle. Williamson was a key member of the Timbers team that won the MLS is Back tournament in 2020.

International career
Williamson appeared for the United States U-20 team 20 times in 2017, including 5 appearances at the U-20 World Cup and 6 at the U-20 CONCACAF Championship (which the US won), and played for the U-23 team once in 2019.

He made his debut with the senior national team on July 11, 2021 in a Gold Cup game against Haiti.

Personal
Williamson is the cousin of the singer, actress, and producer Queen Latifah.

Career statistics

Club

International

Honors
College
Big Ten Midfielder of the Year: 2017
All-Big Ten First Team: 2017

Portland Timbers
MLS is Back Tournament: 2020

United States
CONCACAF Gold Cup: 2021

United States U20
CONCACAF Under-20 Championship: 2017

References

External links
 Profile at Maryland
 Profile at US Soccer

1997 births
Living people
Sportspeople from Alexandria, Virginia
Soccer players from Alexandria, Virginia
American soccer players
Homegrown Players (MLS)
United States men's under-20 international soccer players
Maryland Terrapins men's soccer players
Portland Timbers players
Portland Timbers 2 players
C.D. Santa Clara players
Major League Soccer players
USL Championship players
Expatriate footballers in Portugal
American expatriate sportspeople in Portugal
Association football midfielders
United States men's under-23 international soccer players
2021 CONCACAF Gold Cup players
United States men's international soccer players
CONCACAF Gold Cup-winning players